In mathematics, the theta representation is a particular representation of the Heisenberg group of quantum mechanics. It gains its name from the fact that the Jacobi theta function is invariant under the action of a discrete subgroup of the Heisenberg group. The representation was popularized by David Mumford.

Construction
The theta representation is a representation of the continuous Heisenberg group  over the field of the real numbers. In this representation, the group elements act on a particular Hilbert space. The construction below proceeds first by defining operators that correspond to the Heisenberg group generators. Next, the Hilbert space on which these act is defined, followed by a demonstration of the isomorphism to the usual representations.

Group generators
Define the operators Sa and Tb such that they act on holomorphic functions as

and

It can be seen that each operator generates a one-parameter subgroup:

and

However, S and T do not commute:

Thus we see that S and T together with a unitary phase form a nilpotent Lie group, the (continuous real) Heisenberg group, parametrizable as  where U(1) is the unitary group.

A general group element  then acts on a holomorphic function f(z) as

where   is the center of H, the commutator subgroup . The parameter  on  serves only to remind that every different value of  gives rise to a different representation of the action of the group.

Hilbert space
The action of the group elements  is unitary and irreducible on a certain Hilbert space of functions. For a fixed value of τ, define a norm on entire functions of the complex plane as

Let  be the set of entire functions f with finite norm. The subscript  is used only to indicate that the space depends on the choice of parameter . This  forms a Hilbert space.

This norm is closely related to that used to define Segal–Bargmann space.

Isomorphism
The above theta representation of the Heisenberg group is isomorphic to the canonical Weyl representation of the Heisenberg group. Let

 

Here, h is Planck's constant. Each such representation is unitarily inequivalent. The corresponding theta representation is:

Discrete subgroup
Define the subgroup  as

The Jacobi theta function is defined as

It is an entire function of z that is invariant under  This follows from the properties of the theta function:

and

when a and b are integers. It can be shown that the Jacobi theta is the unique such function.

See also
 Segal–Bargmann space
 Hardy space

References
 David Mumford, Tata Lectures on Theta I (1983), Birkhäuser, Boston 

Elliptic functions
Theta functions
Lie groups
Mathematical quantization